Caroline Jane Sweetman (born 23 July 1983 in Edinburgh, Midlothian) is a former Scottish international cricketer whose career for the Scottish national side spanned from 2001 to 2010. She had played 4 women's one-day internationals

References

External links
 CricketArchive
 ESPNcricinfo

1983 births
Living people
Scotland women One Day International cricketers
Scottish women cricketers
Cricketers from Edinburgh
Wicket-keepers